Adolphe "Ade" John Schwammel (October 14, 1908 – November 18, 1979) was an American football tackle who played five seasons in the National Football League with the Green Bay Packers.

High school career
Schwammel attended Fremont High School in Oakland, California and starred in football.

College career
Schwammel chose to enroll at Oregon State for his college education and to play football.  He ettered in football from 1931 through 1933, earning first-team All-American and All-Pacific Coast Conference at tackle as a senior was chosen as an All-American at tackle for the 1933 season, for a team that had a 6-2-2 record that included a win over powerhouse Fordham University and a scoreless tie with the USC Trojans, ending USC's 26-game winning streak in a game played with exactly 11 players without any substitutions by Oregon State.  He was also chosen to play in the 1934 East-West Shrine Game.

Schwammel was one of the key players in the now illegal "Pyramid Play"  where the Beavers hoisted 6'7" Clyde Devine atop the shoulders of 6'2" Schwammel and 6'2" teammate Harry Shields in order to block a placekick. The play was first successfully used in a game against the University of Oregon, and a picture of the play published in the Saturday Evening Post brought the team — and the play — national attention, leading to the pyramid technique being banned by the NCAA's rules committee shortly thereafter.

Schwammel was a member of the Phi Delta Theta fraternity during his time at Oregon State.

Professional career
Schwammel played in the NFL for five seasons with the Green Bay Packers, in two separate stints, from 1934–1936 and from 1943–1944, with a gap of seven years for service in World War II.  During his time with the Packers, they won two professional titles.

Legacy
Schwammel was named to the Oregon Sports Hall of Fame in 1981 and the Oregon State University Hall of Fame in 1990, both for his football prowess. He died in Honolulu, Hawaii in November 1979.

References

External links
Oregon State University Sports Hall of Fame

1908 births
1979 deaths
Players of American football from Oakland, California
American football tackles
Oregon State Beavers football players
Green Bay Packers players
Players of American football from Los Angeles
American military personnel of World War II